The Computer Crimes Act 1997, is a Malaysian law which was enacted to provide for offences relating to the misuse of computers.

Structure
The Computer Crimes Act 1997, in its current form (1 January 2006), consists of 3 Parts containing 12 sections and no schedule (including no amendment).
 Part I: Preliminary
 Part II: Offences
 Part III: Ancillary and General Provisions

References

External links
 Computer Crimes Act 1997 

1997 in Malaysian law
Malaysian federal legislation